The Richmond Kickers Academy is the official youth system of the Richmond Kickers, a professional soccer club based in Richmond, Virginia that compete in USL Pro. The Kickers Academy features two youth teams, a U-18 and U-16 side, who both compete in the U.S. Soccer Development Academy. The Academy also features a Pre-Academy, U-14 side, who also compete in the Academy leagues.

The Academy was formally founded in 2008.

The Academy 
The Kickers Academy is a three-tiered academy featuring the main academy, which includes a U-18 and U-16 team, along with the pre-academy, which includes a U-14 team. The Academy was created in 2008, and succeed the original development team, which was the Richmond Kickers Future, a reserve side that played in the USL Premier Development League.

Rosters

Kickers U-18

Kickers U-16

Pre-Kickers U-14 
Oliver

Honors

See also 
 Richmond Kickers
 Richmond Kickers Future
 U.S. Soccer Development Academy

References

External links 
 Official Homepage
 Kickers U-18
 Kickers U-16
 Kickers U-14

Academy
Reserve soccer teams in the United States
Soccer academies in the United States
2008 establishments in Virginia